Elibia is a genus of moths in the family Sphingidae. The genus was erected by Francis Walker in 1856.

Species
Elibia dolichus (Westwood, 1847)
Elibia linigera Boisduval, 1875

References

Macroglossini
Moth genera
Taxa named by Francis Walker (entomologist)